The 2017 Internazionali di Tennis del Friuli Venezia Giulia was a professional tennis tournament played on clay courts. It was the fourteenth edition of the tournament which was part of the 2017 ATP Challenger Tour. It took place in Cordenons, Italy between 14 and 20 August 2017.

Singles main-draw entrants

Seeds

 1 Rankings are as of 7 August 2017.

Other entrants
The following players received wildcards into the singles main draw:
  Dragoș Dima
  Gianluca Mager
  Andrea Pellegrino
  Lorenzo Sonego

The following player received entry into the singles main draw using a protected ranking:
  Daniel Muñoz de la Nava

The following player received entry into the singles main draw as an alternate:
  Mikael Ymer

The following players received entry from the qualifying draw:
  Martín Cuevas
  Gianluca Di Nicola
  Christian Lindell
  Adelchi Virgili

Champions

Singles

  Elias Ymer def.  Roberto Carballés Baena 6–2, 6–3.

Doubles

  Roman Jebavý /  Zdeněk Kolář def.  Matwé Middelkoop /  Igor Zelenay 6–2, 6–3.

External links
Official Website

2017 ATP Challenger Tour
2017
2017 in Italian tennis